The speckle-breasted woodpecker (Dendropicos poecilolaemus) is a species of bird in the family Picidae, which is native to sub-Saharan Africa.

Range
It is found in Cameroon, Central African Republic, Chad, DRC, Kenya, Nigeria, Rwanda, South Sudan, and Uganda.

References

speckle-breasted woodpecker
Birds of Central Africa
speckle-breasted woodpecker
Taxonomy articles created by Polbot